Stolbikha is a rural locality (a village) in Tiginskoye Rural Settlement, Vozhegodsky District, Vologda Oblast, Russia. The population was 29 as of 2002.

Geography 
Stolbikha is located 29 km northwest of Vozhega (the district's administrative centre) by road. Khmylitsa is the nearest rural locality.

References 

Rural localities in Vozhegodsky District